Robert Knott Blessley (1833–1923) was a British architect based in Eastbourne, East Sussex.

He was born in Highgate, London to Robert and Mary Blessley.

After training as an architect he set up an office in Furnival's Inn, London before moving to Eastbourne by 1866. In 1878 he was in partnership with fellow architect Herbert Spurrell. During his time in Eastbourne he was responsible for the design of several local developments, including the Grand Hotel and the Leaf Hall.

Major works
Leaf Hall in Eastbourne was designed and built in the continental gothic style in 1863–64 as a working men's institute for the philanthropist William Leaf. Its facilities included a coffee room, lending library and reading room, smoking room, skittle yard and a lecture room capable of seating 200 people. In the absence of a local theatre the hall was used for staging visiting shows, including General Tom Thumb in 1865. It now serves as a community arts centre and is a grade II listed building.

The Grand Hotel at Eastbourne, built for local resident William Earp in 1877, is a 5-star luxury hotel with a 400-foot frontage facing the sea. It has 152 rooms, including 23 suites, 30 junior suites and 99 rooms and offers conference and banqueting facilities with 17 fully equipped conference and meeting rooms of varying size. The hotel was taken over by the De Vere Hotel Group in 1965 and then by Elite Hotels in 1998.

Other works
 Church and vicarage, Margate, Kent (1872–73)
 St John's Church, Polegate, East Sussex (1874–76)
 Extension to St Anne, Eastbourne (1883) (since demolished)

Private life
He married Mary Ann Holyer in 1875. They had a son Robert Walter Holyer Blessley.

References

1833 births
1923 deaths
Architects from Sussex